Mark Costello (November 10, 1955 – August 23, 2015) was an American politician and businessman who served as Commissioner of Labor of Oklahoma from 2011 to 2015. A Republican, he was elected in 2010, defeating the Democratic incumbent, Lloyd Fields. Before his election he was a businessman who founded several technology companies.

After taking office, he established a non-profit advocacy group  to oppose the positions of public employee unions, and fought federal regulations on family farms.

Personal life
Costello was born in Bartlesville and graduated from College High School, then attended the University of Kansas while working summers on oil rigs in the North Sea. He married Cathy Cerkey in 1982; they had five children.

Costello founded American Computer & Telephone (AMCAT) in 1991, a telephone software company based in Oklahoma City. AMCAT was sold in 2007. He founded another telecommunications company, USA Digital Communications, in 1997. He identified as Catholic and pro-life, and was a member of the National Rifle Association.

Death
Costello was fatally stabbed by his son, Christian, on August 23, 2015, at a Braum's restaurant in Oklahoma City. His son was arrested following the incident, and was reported to have a history of mental illness. In 2018, Christian Costello was declared not guilty by reason of insanity, and was committed to a state mental hospital.

Election results
July 27, 2010 Republican Primary

November 2, 2010 General Election

November 4, 2014 General Election

References

1955 births
2015 deaths
20th-century American businesspeople
21st-century American businesspeople
21st-century American politicians
Businesspeople from Oklahoma
Burials in Oklahoma
Deaths by stabbing in the United States
Oklahoma Labor Commissioners
Oklahoma Republicans
Patricides
People from Bartlesville, Oklahoma
People from Edmond, Oklahoma
People murdered in Oklahoma
University of Kansas alumni